See also Windows Subsystem for Linux GUI.

North Country Public Radio is a National Public Radio member regional radio network headquartered in Canton, New York. The member-supported network is owned by St. Lawrence University and is the National Public Radio (NPR) member for the Adirondack North Country region of northern New York.   Its radio studios are in the Noble Medical Building on the SLU campus.

It was a charter member of NPR. It adopted the on-air name North Country Public Radio in 1984. In the same year, it built the first of several low-powered FM translators. Much of the surrounding area was among the few places in the Northeastern United States that were still without public radio. Its first full-powered repeaters, WSLO in Malone and WSLL in Saranac Lake, began broadcasting in 1989, with additional stations signing on in the early 1990s.

It now comprises 15 full-power FM transmitters and 18 low-powered translators serving the North Country, parts of western Vermont and the Canadian provinces of Ontario and Quebec with regional and national news, public affairs programs, and an eclectic variety of music. Major cities in its coverage area are Watertown, Plattsburgh, and Glens Falls in New York, as well as Burlington, Vermont and Cornwall, Ontario.

In May 2011, North Country Public Radio also launched WREM, a radio station in Canton which offers a distinct program schedule sourced from Public Radio Exchange.

Stations

Notes:

Translators

References

External links
 NCPR website
 North Country at Work

NPR member networks
St. Lawrence University
1968 establishments in New York (state)
Radio stations established in 1968